Coon Creek Peak is a mountain in northern Elko County, Nevada, about 4 miles southwest of the community of Jarbidge. It is considered to be the most northeasterly peak of the Copper Mountains. Located a few miles west of the main crest of the Jarbidge Mountains, it is located within the Jarbidge Ranger District of the Humboldt-Toiyabe National Forest. The main road entering Jarbidge from the south, Charleston-Jarbidge Road (National Forest Road 062 and Elko County Route 748
), runs along the western slopes of the mountain as it travels between Coon Creek Summit and Bear Creek Summit, providing close vehicular access to the summit of Coon Creek Peak.

References

External links 
 

Mountains of Elko County, Nevada
Mountains of Nevada
Humboldt–Toiyabe National Forest